Aguie  is a department of the Maradi Region in Niger. Its capital lies at the city of Aguie.   Among the commune subdivisions within the Department are the "Rural Communes" of Saé Saboua, Arnagou and Giratawa. Nearby villages include Dan Kiri, Dan Gao, Gamji Karama, Dan Rago, Doromawa, Guidan Tonio, and Guidan Kodao.

Population
As of 2011, the department had a total population of 386,197 people. A primarily Hausa populated region, it is bordered to the south by Katsina State, Nigeria. This is following a partial UN funded development census of the region from 2005. The Maradi Region is one of the most densely populated areas of Niger, home to 20 per cent of the country’s population, most of whom are small farmers in rural settlements.

Transport
Aguié lies on the main east-west highway between Maradi and Zinder.

References

Departments of Niger
Maradi Region